Wilbur H. Hamilton (July 19, 1909 – July 22, 1964) was an American businessman and politician from Philadelphia.

Born in the neighborhood of Manayunk, in Philadelphia, Pennsylvania, Hamilton was one of the sons of William J. Hamilton, Sr. and a member of a prominent Republican family in the city. He served in the United States Army during World War II. He went to the American Institute of Banking and was in the mortgage and bond business.

Hamilton worked for Boardman–Hamilton & Company Insurance company, eventually becoming its chairman. He also followed his father into politics; from 1951 to 1955, he served in the Pennsylvania House of Representatives. In 1955, he ran for Philadelphia City Council from the 8th district and won, the only Republican to win a district seat that year. In 1956, after his brother William Jr. died, he became leader of the 21st ward. He rose through the ranks of the Republican Party hierarchy to become Chairman of the City Committee, the effective boss of the organization. He was a delegate to the 1964 Republican National Convention. On the way home from the convention, he suffered a heart attack and died suddenly at the age of 55.

References

Sources

 
 

1909 births
1964 deaths
Businesspeople from Philadelphia
Military personnel from Pennsylvania
Philadelphia City Council members
Republican Party members of the Pennsylvania House of Representatives
20th-century American politicians
20th-century American businesspeople